Gerolamo Radice (11 November 1883 – 19 November 1948) was an Italian professional footballer, who played as a goalkeeper, and football referee.

Honours

Club 
Milan F.B.C.C.
Prima Categoria: 1907

External links 
Profile at MagliaRossonera.it 

1883 births
1948 deaths
Italian footballers
Italian football referees
Association football goalkeepers
A.C. Milan players